The Centre Party is a Nordic agrarian, populist, and conservative political party in Iceland, established in September 2017. It split from the Progressive Party due to leadership disputes, when two factions decided to band up as a new party before the 2017 Icelandic parliamentary election. The Centre Party belongs to the Nordic agrarian party family, and like many parties in Iceland, is Eurosceptic.

Ideology 
A self-proclaimed liberal and centrist party, the party is generally conservative and populist. The party proposes to reform the state's banking sector, maintaining government ownership of Landsbankinn, while reclaiming the state's stake in Arion Bank, which is controlled by hedge funds, and redistributing a third of its shares among Icelanders. It also plans to sell the government's existing stake in Íslandsbanki. The party supports scrapping indexation on debts and opposes the accession of Iceland to the European Union.

At the inaugural meeting of the party in Reykjavik on 8 October, the party's chairman and founder Sigmundur Davíð Gunnlaugsson stated that the party supported the best ideas of the left and right, emphasizing both the protection of individual rights and social security, while also focusing on regional issues in the same vein of the Northern Powerhouse in the United Kingdom and improving benefits for the elderly. The party also proposes to improve ferry services and construct a new university hospital.

The party opposed the expansion of the abortion limit from the 16th week of the pregnancy to the 22nd week. The party opposed legislation to allow individuals to define their own gender in the eyes of the law. One of the party's members has called for teaching climate change denial views in public schools. In 2021, Sigmundur Davíð called for the Icelandic government to take up the same asylum policy as that implemented by the Danish Social Democrats, that policy being to send asylum seekers to countries outside of Europe while their case is being processed. Sigmundur Davíð stated that the goal of this policy was to ensure that no one would come to the country seeking asylum.

Supporters 
According to a poll conducted by the Social Science Research Institute at the University of Iceland for Morgunblaðið in October 2017, the party drew nearly half its support from supporters of the Progressive Party in the 2016 Icelandic parliamentary election, with another quarter from the Independence Party, and 13% from the liberal Reform Party and Bright Future. Sigmundur Davíð has traditionally attracted support due to his nationalist and populist views, though he did not express such views during the 2017 campaign.

Controversy 
In December 2018, a leaked recording captured four MPs of the Centre Party, including party leader Sigmundur Davíð, discussing women and a disabled woman in denigrating and sexually charged language. The scandal was known as the Klaustur Affair.

In October 2021, Birgir Þórarinsson, who was elected as a Centre Party candidate in elections the month before, announced that he was leaving the Centre Party and joining the Independence Party instead. Birgir cited the 2018 scandal as his reason for leaving the party. After Birgir's defection, the Centre Party was left with two members of the Althing.

Electoral results

Leaders

References

External links 
 Official website (in Icelandic)

Conservative parties in Iceland
Eurosceptic parties in Iceland
Liberal parties in Iceland
Nordic agrarian parties
Political parties established in 2017